The 5th Arizona State Legislature, consisting of the Arizona State Senate and the Arizona House of Representatives, was constituted from January 1, 1921, to December 31, 1922, during the third term of Thomas Edward Campbell, as Governor of Arizona, in Phoenix. While the Senate remained at 19 members, the size of the House was increased from 35 to 39, with 3 additional representatives added to Maricopa County, and an additional representative for Pinal County. For the first time, the Republicans achieved a majority in one of the houses, the Senate, with a 10–9 edge, while the Democrats were able to barely hold on to their majority in the House, 20–19.

Sessions
The Legislature met for the regular session at the State Capitol in Phoenix on January 10, 1921; and adjourned on March 10.

A special session was convened on February 15, 1922, and was adjourned on April 15.

Significant legislation
One of the most significant pieces was the creation of the Arizona Industrial Commission in 1921. The 5th Legislature made the first attempt to reorganize the state government. At the prompting of Governor Campbell, the Republican-held Senate introduced a bill to establish 8 cabinet level departments: Military Affairs, Finance, Agriculture, Public Welfare, Public Works and Buildings, Reclamation and Irrigation, Education and Registration, and Labor and Industry. It passed along party lines in the Senate, 10–8 (one Democratic Senator was absent), but never made it out of the House committee once it was sent over to the Democrat-held House.

State Senate

Members
The asterisk (*) denotes members of the previous Legislature who continued in office as members of this Legislature.

House of Representatives

Members
The asterisk (*) denotes members of the previous Legislature who continued in office as members of this Legislature.

References

Arizona legislative sessions
1921 in Arizona
1922 in Arizona
1921 U.S. legislative sessions
1922 U.S. legislative sessions